Khereshk (also Romanized as Khareshk and Khereshk; also known as (Khereshk-e Pā’īn, Bālā Maḩalleh-ye Khereshk, Khereshki) is a village in Rahmatabad Rural District, Rahmatabad and Blukat District, Rudbar County, Gilan Province, Iran. At the 2006 census, its population was 124, in 43 families.

References 

Populated places in Rudbar County